The Men’s 50 metre breaststroke at the 2014 IPC Swimming European Championships was held at the Pieter van den Hoogenband Swimming Stadium, in Eindhoven from 4–10 August.

Medalists

See also
List of IPC world records in swimming

References

breaststroke 50 m men